Tenke may refer to:

 Tenke, the Hungarian name for Tinca Commune, Bihor County, Romania
 Tenke,  Democratic Republic of the Congo